Michael Bochtler (born 15 October 1975) is a German former professional footballer who played as a defender.

External links
 
 

1975 births
Living people
German footballers
Association football defenders
VfB Stuttgart players
FC St. Pauli players
SK Sturm Graz players
VfR Aalen players
FC Nöttingen players
FV Illertissen players
FC Carl Zeiss Jena players
German expatriate footballers
German expatriate sportspeople in Austria
Expatriate footballers in Austria
Sportspeople from Ulm
Footballers from Baden-Württemberg